Phiomyoides is an extinct species of rodent known from Miocene fossils found in Africa.

References

 Stromer, E. 1926. Reste land-und süsswasser-bewohnender Wirbeltiere aus den Diamantenfeldern Deutsch-Südwestafrikas, p. 107-153. In Kaiser, E. (ed.), Die Diamantenwüste Südwestafrikas 2. D. Reimer, Berlin.

Myophiomyidae
Miocene rodents
Prehistoric rodent genera
Fossil taxa described in 1926